Richard Lyons may refer to:

Richard Lyons (Warden of the Mint) (1310–1381), royal councillor who was imprisoned by the Good Parliament in 1376 on suspicion of embezzlement
Richard Lyons, 1st Viscount Lyons (1817–1887), British diplomat
Richard Lyons (writer) (1920–2000), American poet, and Professor of English
Richard Lyons (mathematician) (born 1945), American mathematician, specializing in finite group theory. Namesake of the Lyons group
Dicky Lyons (born 1947), former American football player
Richard Lyons (business professor)  (born 1961), American academic and Dean of the Haas School of Business, UC Berkeley
Richard Lyons (racing driver) (born 1979), British racing car driver
Richard Lyons (poet) (fl. 1984 – present), American poet and teacher
Richard J. Lyons (1895–1959), American lawyer and politician

See also 
 Richard Lyon (disambiguation)